Kichadi is another name for Pachadi used in some parts of Kerala, for the sour variant of the dish. A sour dish made of curd, ground  cumin paste and either cucumber, ash gourd or white gourd, with sautéed  mustard seeds and curry leaves as garnish. Kichadi is often served as part of the Sadhya. It is somewhat similar to the Raita served in North India, with the difference being the seasoning with mustard and curry leaves. Kichadi is not to be confused with Khichdi.

The Kichadi forms a part of the Keralite feast known as Sadhya, which is quite popular during festivals such as Onam and Vishu.

See also
 Cuisine of Kerala
 Sadya

References

Kerala cuisine